Midriff Music is a studio album by Canadian hip hop artist Josh Martinez. It was released on Josh Martinez's independent label Camobear Records on September 22, 2005.

Music 
The album is entirely produced by South California producer Samix. It features one guest verse from Kunga 219.

Track listing

References

External links 
 Midriff Music at Bandcamp
 Midriff Music at Discogs

2005 albums
Josh Martinez albums